Chip Tsao (born 17 August 1958), also known by his Chinese language pen name To Kit, is a multilingual Hong Kong-based columnist, broadcaster, and writer. His writings are mostly in Chinese. He is well known for his sarcasm and wry sense of humour.

Family and education

Tsao's family traces their roots back to Guangxi. His father was the vice chief editor of Ta Kung Pao, a leftwing newspaper in Hong Kong, whilst his mother was also an editor of the same paper. His maternal grandfather was a journalist of the Pearl River Daily. He was raised in Hong Kong's Wanchai district, and began reading early in his life. Tsao attended Pui Kiu Middle School and later Lingnan Secondary School in Hong Kong. During this time, his writing was once published in The New Evening Post. In 1983, he was awarded a BA in English and European Literature from the University of Warwick. Then he completed a Postgraduate Diploma in International Relations from the London School of Economics. He states that he never thought about becoming a writer in his youth, however, and that his parents discouraged him from this career because they felt it would be dangerous.

Tsao is married and has two children.

Career
Tsao began his journalism career in the United Kingdom as a reporter for the BBC and Radio Television Hong Kong. Then, famous writer Jin Yong (Louis Cha) invited him to write a regular column for Ming Pao about his experiences living abroad. It was at this time that he began to use his pen name To Kit. The name of his column in Ming Pao,"'The Golden Venture", derives from the name of a vessel that took Chinese illegal immigrants to the United States in 1993. His first book, Alongside Thames, was published in 1995.

Tsao later he joined a team of broadcasters to host a weekly current affairs programme on RTHK named 'Free as Wind'. In September 2003, he switched to the Commercial Radio Hong Kong to host a similar daily radio entitled 'Summit' (literally 'the Peak of Light').

Tsao currently writes for Apple Daily and HK Magazine. Pieces from his columns, such as  Come On, James, have gone viral and become an internet sensation in several new forms of adaptations.

Tsao is not without his controversies. His status as a premier writer of Hong Kong is often challenged, one example being a piece by Rosetta Lui and Perry Lam in the December 2007 issue of Muse: "Some 15 or 20 years from now, the books of Chip Tsao... if they are talked about at all, will most probably be used as anecdotal evidence to illustrate how dumbed-down our city's culture has become since the 1997 return to Chinese sovereignty. His essays are always funny, sometimes lyrical but almost never ruminative."

Political viewpoints

Hong Kong politics
Tsao first began writing about Hong Kong public affairs in a column for English-language newspaper Eastern Express. He is often perceived as pro-British, and has been accused of looking down on China. But in a South China Morning Post interview in 2008, Tsao explained his position on China and denied that he was an anglophile, saying: "I am critical of modern China but if people think criticising makes you a traitor, that’s their problem. Some people say I’m an Anglophile but I don’t consider myself one. I just admire beautiful things and good values, and that includes Tibetan culture. There are bad things about the Brits too – they can be hypocrites and racists."

Accusations of racism
Tsao has faced various accusations of racism for his English-language writings. In October 2005, an article he wrote for the South China Morning Post entitled "Have Hong Kong girls stopped looking for Mr White?" sparked accusations that he promoted discrimination and was jealous of white men in Hong Kong. Tsao responded that he was merely being sarcastic and provocative, repeating themes which were often discussed in Chinese media, and accused his critics themselves of being racist and lacking the ability to "read between the lines".

On 27 March 2009, an article of Tsao's entitled "The War at Home" was published in the free HK Magazine. In it, he wrote that the Philippines was unworthy of claiming the Spratly Islands from China because "as a nation of servants, you don't flex your muscles at your master, from whom you earn most of your bread and butter." Many Filipinos decried his article as racist, discriminatory, and demeaning, and the Philippine government declared him an "undesirable alien" as a result. His writings provoked negative reactions from various Philippine legislators; Senator Pia Cayetano stated that "instead of contributing to intelligent discussions on ways to resolve the Spratlys dispute, Tsao only succeeded in eliciting hatred and sowing more confusion not only among Filipinos but maybe even among his fellow Chinese who are not aware of the intricacies of the issue", while Parañaque Congressman Roilo Golez refused to accept Tsao's apology for his article, and challenged him to a boxing match. On 30 March 2009, HK Magazine issued an apology for the offence Tsao's article had caused. The following day, Tsao subsequently admitted his wrongdoing and apologised to the Philippine government and its people in an interview aired over Hong Kong’s ATV. He said, "I realized that I had crossed the line. I now offer my public apology." He has also indicated, however, that the article was meant as satire, and that it "was never intended to be insulting to the Filipino domestic workers."

Criticism of #MeToo
In 2017, Tsao posted on Facebook mocking the Me Too movement one day after the revelation from Hong Kong athlete Lui Lai Yiu that she was sexually assaulted by a former coach. Tsao wrote that he was touched on the face without his consent by a female teacher when he was in kindergarten and now he realised that he was "one of the victims of low-end sex abuse". "Thanks to the Facebook generation, by simply attaching a selfie, anyone can become a Harvey Weinstein or a Kevin Spacey," he added. Some praised him for his "good sense of humour" and recognizing that any man could be open to accusations over past inappropriate behaviour of which they may or may not be guilty. More including the Equal Opportunities Commission and the Association Concerning Sexual Violence Against Women criticised him for inappropriate analogy and ignorance on sexual violence.

Works
Tsao's work, both on radio and in his columns, concentrates on the following subjects:
Changes in governance of Hong Kong prior to and following the transfer of sovereignty to China
The essence of classical Chinese and Western civilisation
Difference between Chinese and Westerners (particular in terms of politics and lifestyle)
The 'peasant mentality' of the Chinese
Films A new film called "ENTHRALLED" released on 10 April 2014 in Hong Kong which portrays post-handover Hong Kong through the love story of a group of returnees. 
Prominent women (he wrote a column on the achievements of well-known Chinese women in Ming Pao Monthly between 1998 and 2003)

Publications
Major works by Chip Tsao:

References

1958 births
Living people
Alumni of the University of Warwick
Hong Kong columnists
Hong Kong writers
British expatriates in Hong Kong